Cornell Green may refer to:

 Cornell Green (defensive back), defensive back who played for the Dallas Cowboys in the 1960s and 70s
 Cornell Green (offensive tackle), offensive tackle who is currently a free agent